Kim Hong-il (23 September 1898 – 8 August 1980) was a Korean independence activist and a general of the Second Sino-Japanese War and the Korean War, who later became a diplomat and politician in South Korea. Born in North Pyongan, he did his early schooling in China and Korea, and had a brief career as a teacher before his connections with the nascent Korean independence movement led to his imprisonment. He fled into exile in China in 1918, and served in the Kuomintang's National Revolutionary Army from 1926 to 1948, following which he moved to the newly independent South Korea to join the Republic of Korea Army. He commanded South Korea's I Corps during the first year of the Korean War, and was then sent to Taipei as South Korea's ambassador to the Republic of China, which by then had retreated to Taiwan. His assignment there ultimately lasted nine years. He returned to South Korea in 1960 following the April Revolution which ended the rule of Syngman Rhee, and served briefly as Minister of Foreign Affairs under the Park Chung-hee junta. He ran for the National Assembly, first unsuccessfully in 1960 and 1963, and was then elected in 1967 and became a major figure in the opposition New Democratic Party.

Being one of the most experienced and high-ranked among the officer corps that commanded the early Republic of Korea Army, he was nicknamed the "Five-star General".

Early life and military career in China 
Kim was born on 23 September 1898 in Ryongchon County, North Pyongan Province. At age 15, shortly after the beginning of Japanese rule over Korea, he went to Fengtian (today Liaoning), China to attend a primary school there. He later became an instructor at the Gyeongsin School in Sinchon County, Hwanghae Province, but his involvement in agitation against Japanese rule as a member of the alumni association of the Osan School resulted in his imprisonment.

After his release, Kim fled into exile in China in 1918. In China he used a variety of aliases, including the Korean name Choe Se-pyeong and the Chinese names Wang Hsiung, Wang Yi-shu, and Wang Fu-kao. After his graduation in 1920 he proceeded to the Russian Far East to try to gain Russian support for the Korean independence movement, but faced numerous setbacks: first the fratricidal killings of the Massacre of Svobodny in 1921, and then the withdrawal of Russian support in 1922. As a result, he crossed back into Northeast China late that year. His alias Choe Se-pyeong itself embroiled him in a minor scandal in the village: it was rumoured he wanted to court a woman there whose surname was also Choe, but romance between individuals with the same surname was not encouraged in traditional Korean society, due to the possibility of violating the prohibition on marriage between people belonging to the same bon-gwan (clan). As a result, he revealed his real name to several people.

However, Japanese secret police were increasingly active in Northeast China hunting down Korean partisans, and for his own safety Kim left the region and went to Shanghai. In 1926, he joined the Republic of China's National Revolutionary Army. His second son Kim Young-jai was born around this time. While assigned to the latter post, at the request of Kim Koo of the Provisional Government of the Republic of Korea, he provided Lee Bong-chang and Yun Bong-gil with the bombs used in 1932 in the Sakuradamon assassination attempt against Emperor Hirohito and the Hongkew Park attack on Japanese troops which killed General Yoshinori Shirakawa of the Shanghai Expeditionary Army. During the Shanghai War of 1932, he served as an intelligence officer with the 19th Route Army. In 1934, he was reassigned to the Luoyang branch of the Republic of China Military Academy, where he was in charge of a special course for Korean officer candidates in the ROC army.

During the Second Sino-Japanese War, Kim was promoted to the rank of major-general in 1939, and lieutenant general in May 1945.

In South Korea

Military career 

In August 1948, Kim moved to South Korea to join the newly formed Republic of Korea Army. He was assigned to be the principal of the Korea Military Academy. In 1949, he finished writing the Outline of National Defense, one of the earliest works of the new country's Ministry of National Defense regarding military strategy.

After the outbreak of the Korean War on 25 June 1950, Kim became the commander of the I Corps. During the First Battle of Seoul, the I Corps held a position at Kumchon, North Hwanghae, to the north of Uijeongbu. Once he learned of the North Koreans' 28 June capture of Seoul, Kim had his forces retreat to the south bank of the Han River and set up a defensive line, which they were able to hold for six days until 3 July when North Korea had recovered sufficiently from the demolition of the Hangang Bridge to begin sending tanks across the river. Historian Jongsuk Chay credited the time earned by this operation with "saving the Republic of Korea from communism". Kim went on to fight in the Battle of Pusan Perimeter later that year. However, his conflicts with President Syngman Rhee and American military officers led to his discharge in March 1951.

As a diplomat 

Kim arrived in Taipei, Taiwan on 3 November 1951 to begin his service as ambassador to the Republic of China. He remained in the position until 13 June 1960. On the occasion of his departure, General  presented him with the Order of the Cloud and Banner in recognition of his wartime military service to the Republic of China, as well as the second rank of the civilian Order of Brilliant Star. Kim was one of a large number of high-level diplomatic personnel who resigned in the aftermath of the April Revolution, along with ambassador to the U.S.  and ambassador to Japan . In the aftermath of Park Chung-hee's May 1961 coup, Kim served a brief term as Minister of Foreign Affairs from 21 May until his resignation on 21 July. He continued to play a role in foreign affairs after his resignation, and was dispatched to Niger in December 1961 as South Korea's representative to the celebrations for Niger's fourth Republic Day.

In politics 
Kim made his first foray into electoral politics in the 1960 elections as a candidate for the Senate. He announced his intention to run when he resigned from his ambassadorial post. He ran as an independent in the Seoul electoral district, facing off against multiple Democratic Party and Liberal Party candidates. In 1962, he was awarded the Independence Medal of the Order of Merit for National Foundation. Kim then ran again in the 1963 elections as one of six Korea Independence Party candidates. The party received 1.28% of all votes cast, and failed to secure any seats.

Kim's objections to the 1965 Treaty on Basic Relations between Japan and the Republic of Korea later led him into further conflict with the Park regime. While the treaty negotiations were ongoing, Kim co-authored a series of op-eds along with Association of Families of Patriotic Martyrs president Koo Sung-suh, former Minister of Justice , Christian philosopher Ham Seok-heon, former prime minister Byeon Yeong-tae, and linguist , which were published on the front page of the Kyunghyang Shinmun in February 1965. After the signing of the treaty in June, Kim intensified his public activities in opposition to it. On 27 July, he became a founding member of the Citizens'  Council for the Protection of the Fatherland, which aimed to block ratification of the treaty. After he failed to achieve that goal, he issued a statement on behalf of the council calling for the National Assembly to be dissolved and a new general election to be held. Then on 27 August, Kim and ten other Republic of Korea Reserve Forces officers issued another statement calling on the Armed Forces to "maintain political neutrality" in the face of increasing public turmoil relating to the treaty. Two days later, Kim and three co-signers of that statement—former Minister of Defense , former Korean Central Intelligence Agency director , and former minister without portfolio Park Won-bin—were arrested and charged with criminal libel in relation to its contents, and were held at the Seoul Correctional Institute (the former Seodaemun Prison). Further charges of inciting rebellion were laid against the four on 7 September. Kim's three co-defendants were eventually released on ₩50,000 bail on 25 October, while Kim himself was released on the official ground of severe illness.

In 1967, Kim became a founding member of the opposition New Democratic Party, and was elected to represent Mapo-gu in the National Assembly in the elections that year. He played a larger role in the May 1971 legislative elections, running as an at-large representative and also becoming the acting head of the New Democratic Party following the resignation of Yu Chin-san two weeks before the election. He won his election, and also became the official chairman of the New Democratic Party in July following its all-party convention.

Matters came to a head at the party convention in September, held in the absence of Kim's faction, which resulted in the return of Yu Chin-san as party chairman. Kim's faction issued a statement denouncing the results and declaring the convention illegal, but the National Election Commission refused Kim's application for an injunction against the Yu Chin-san faction. However, the Democratic Unification Party performed poorly, and only two of its candidates were elected, Kim not among them. Following the election, Democratic Unification Party leaders expressed regret for participating, and Kim pledged to dedicate the remainder of his life to fighting for the return of democracy.

Retirement and death 
He was re-elected as the seventh president in 1979.

Kim died at his home in Hyochang-dong, Yongsan-gu, Seoul on 8 August 1980. He was survived by his wife Min Gyeong-ran and three sons. Although a public funeral had been planned, in the end Kim's family decided to hold a private funeral at their home, followed by a procession to the Seoul National Cemetery where he was buried. Pastor Kyung-Chik Han of Young Nak Presbyterian Church, the church of which Kim had been a member, presided over the funeral. Roughly 1,500 people visited the family home to pay their respects, including Chun Doo-hwan, United States Forces Korea commander John A. Wickham Jr., and fellow independence activist .

Works

Notes

References

External links 
 
 Photo gallery of Kim's grave at Seoul National Cemetery
 News photo of Kim's second son Kim Young-jai (left) in 1960

1898 births
1980 deaths
People from Ryongchon County
Korean independence activists
Korean expatriates in China
National Revolutionary Army generals
South Korean generals
Military personnel of the Republic of China in the Second Sino-Japanese War
South Korean military personnel of the Korean War
Ambassadors of South Korea to Taiwan
Recipients of the Order of Brilliant Star
20th-century South Korean politicians
Foreign ministers of South Korea
Recipients of the Order of Merit for National Foundation
Members of the National Assembly (South Korea)
Burials at Seoul National Cemetery